Revolutions per minute is a unit of frequency, commonly used to measure rotational speed.

Revolutions per minute may also refer to:

 Revolutions per Minute (Rise Against album), a 2003 album by Rise Against
 Revolutions per Minute (Reflection Eternal album), a 2010 album by Reflection Eternal
 Revolutions per Minute (Skid Row album), a 2006 album by Skid Row

See also
 RPM (disambiguation)

sv:Revolutions Per Minute